Dinélson dos Santos Lima, simply known as Dinélson, (born March 20, 1986) is a Brazilian footballer who plays as an attacking midfielder.

External links
CBF 
sambafoot
gazetaesportiva 
 

1986 births
Living people
Brazilian footballers
Brazilian expatriate footballers
Guarani FC players
Sport Club Corinthians Paulista players
Clube Atlético Mineiro players
Associação Desportiva São Caetano players
Paraná Clube players
Coritiba Foot Ball Club players
Avaí FC players
Daegu FC players
Tianjin Jinmen Tiger F.C. players
Ceará Sporting Club players
Paulista Futebol Clube players
Associação Portuguesa de Desportos players
Campeonato Brasileiro Série A players
Campeonato Brasileiro Série B players
K League 1 players
Chinese Super League players
Expatriate footballers in South Korea
Brazilian expatriate sportspeople in South Korea
Expatriate footballers in China
Brazilian expatriate sportspeople in China
Association football midfielders